Zakaria Aboub (born 3 June 1980 in Casablanca) is a Moroccan association football midfielder.

Club career
He joined FC Istres in January 2006.

International career
Aboub played in the U-23 internationals for Morocco in the 2000 Summer Olympics.

References

External links

1980 births
Living people
Expatriate footballers in France
Expatriate footballers in the United Arab Emirates
FC Istres players
Association football midfielders
Moroccan expatriates in France
Moroccan expatriate sportspeople in the United Arab Emirates
Moroccan footballers
Morocco international footballers
Olympic footballers of Morocco
Footballers at the 2000 Summer Olympics
Footballers from Casablanca
Raja CA players
Sharjah FC players
Al-Raed FC players
UAE Pro League players
Saudi Professional League players